Colasposoma viridicoeruleum is a species of beetle belonging to the family Chrysomelidae, described by Victor Motschulsky in 1860. It is known as a pest of sweet potatoes. The species was formerly known as Colasposoma auripenne until 2003, when C. auripenne was determined to be a synonym of C. viridicoeruleum. It is sometimes considered a southern subspecies of Colasposoma dauricum, using the name Colasposoma dauricum auripenne.

Description
The body is metallic green, blue or dark violaceous. Head is closely punctured, with black antennae. Thorax is twice as broad as long, with rounded sides and a punctured surface. Elytra show more strong punctures in irregular rows.

Distribution
This species can be found in India, Andaman Islands, Myanmar, Malayan Subregion (Malay Peninsula, Sumatra, Java, Borneo and all the Indonesian Archipelago), Amur River region and China.

References

 Global Names Index
 Universal Biological Indexer

viridicoeruleum
Taxa named by Victor Motschulsky
Beetles described in 1860
Beetles of Asia
Beetles of Indonesia
Insects of China
Insects of India
Insects of Myanmar
Insects of Southeast Asia
Agricultural pest insects